Predrag Radosavljević (born June 24, 1963), better known by the nickname Preki, is a Serbian-American former  soccer player and coach. He is currently an assistant coach with Seattle Sounders FC in Major League Soccer (MLS). He previously coached Sacramento Republic FC and Saint Louis FC in the United Soccer League and coached in MLS with Toronto FC and Chivas USA.

During his playing career he played for English clubs Everton and Portsmouth, and was an 'MLS original' upon the formation of MLS in 1996, playing for the Kansas City Wizards (now known as Sporting Kansas City) and Miami Fusion. He is the only two-time winner of the MLS MVP award, now known as the Landon Donovan MVP Award, and represented the United States at the 1998 FIFA World Cup. He was elected to the American National Soccer Hall of Fame in 2010.

In 2015 Preki left his managing role at Sacramento Republic FC by mutual consent. It was thought that he had landed the Leicester City FC job, but it was given to Claudio Ranieri.

Playing career

Professional
Born in Belgrade, SR Serbia, Preki played briefly for Red Star Belgrade in the old Yugoslav First League after coming from FK Čukarički where he played in their youth team. In the summer of 1985, the Tacoma Stars head coach Bob McNab spotted Preki at an indoor tournament in Belgrade. McNab signed Preki.<ref>SECRET' SLAV ADDS SOCK TO STARS' SOCCER OFFENSE THE SEATTLE TIMES – Thursday, October 24, 1985</ref> He played five seasons for the Stars. During those years, he was a three-time First Team All Star, the 1988 and 1989 All Star Game MVP, led the league in assists in 1988 and scoring in 1989 and was the 1989 MISL MVP. During the summer of 1989, Preki began to consider becoming a U.S. citizen and returning to the outdoor game in order to make himself eligible for the U.S. national team. He played one season for Råslätts SK in Sweden in 1990. The Stars released Preki in July 1990 as part of a salary reduction move. In August, he signed with the St. Louis Storm. He played two seasons in St. Louis before being bought by Everton manager Howard Kendall for a fee of £100,000 in the summer of 1992 following a trial. He made 53 appearances for the Blues, 28 of those as a substitute. In June 1994, Preki signed with the San Jose Grizzlies of the Continental Indoor Soccer League where he rejoined Bob McNab from his Tacoma days. He played eight games, scoring sixteen goals, before returning to England in August 1994 to play for Portsmouth. On July 5, 1995, the Grizzlies purchased Preki's contract from Portsmouth. He was the CISL's second leading scorer and league MVP.

Major League Soccer
Preki resumed outdoor play beginning with MLS's inaugural season in 1996 when he joined the Kansas City Wiz, renamed the Wizards after the 1996 season. The league allocated him to the Wiz on February 6, 1996. He played every season of his MLS playing career for the Wizards, except for one season with the Miami Fusion in 2001. After the Fusion were contracted, the Wizards reacquired Preki in the 2002 MLS Dispersal Draft, but only after every other team in the league had passed on selecting him. Preki is the only player to have won the MLS MVP Award and the MLS Scoring Champion Award (now respectively known as the Landon Donovan MVP Award and the MLS Golden Boot) twice, winning in 1997 and 2003, and is also the current all-time league leader in points scored (270 on 79 goals and 112 assists, plus another 25 points on 10 goals and 5 assists in the playoffs). He won the 2000 MLS Cup with the Wizards. Preki retired following the 2005 season, scoring a goal in the last minute of his final game with Kansas City. He was named to the MLS All-Time Best XI after the season, and was 42 years old when he played his final competitive game.

International
Originally from Yugoslavia, Preki was living and working in the U.S. in 1985 but when he was offered a spot on the U.S. national team he applied for U.S. citizenship which was granted on October 25, 1996. He made his debut for the United States on November 3, 1996 against Guatemala at the age of 33, making him one of the oldest players to make an international debut. Preki played a total of 28 games for the U.S., scoring four goals, one of them to beat Brazil at the 1998 Gold Cup. Two of those games, including one against his native Yugoslavia (now Serbia), came in the 1998 FIFA World Cup. He made his last appearance for the national team in a 2–0 loss away to Costa Rica in World Cup qualifying on September 5, 2001.

International goals

Coaching career
Upon the appointment of Bob Bradley as the United States national team head coach, Preki was promoted as head coach of Chivas USA for the 2007 Major League Soccer season.

Preki left Chivas "by mutual consent" on November 12, 2009, following Chivas' failure to progress to the latter stages of the MLS playoffs. He became head coach of Toronto FC on November 19, 2009. However, Preki didn't last the 2010 MLS season with Toronto, being fired along with General Manager Mo Johnston on September 14, 2010. Under Preki, Toronto qualified for the 2010–11 CONCACAF Champions League after winning the 2010 Canadian Championship.

On July 15, 2013, after nearly three years out of coaching, Preki was named head coach of the USL Professional Division (now United Soccer League) expansion Sacramento Republic FC in advance of their inaugural 2014 season. He won the USL Pro Championship game in September 2014 with the club. On July 8, 2015, Preki announced his resignation from his post to take up a coaching role in the United Kingdom.

On October 12, 2016, USL club Saint Louis FC introduced Preki as its coach for the upcoming 2017 season. On November 20, 2017, Saint Louis FC relieved Preki of his coaching duties.

In January 2018, Preki was hired as an assistant coach to Brian Schmetzer with the Seattle Sounders FC.

Coaching record

Honors
Tacoma Stars'
 Major Indoor Soccer League runner-up: 1986–87Kansas City WizardsMLS Cup: 2000
Supporters' Shield: 2000
US Open Cup: 2004Individual'''
Major Indoor Soccer League MVP: 1988–89
Major Indoor Soccer League Scoring Champion: 1988–89
Major Indoor Soccer League Pass Master (most assists): 1987–88, 1988–89
1989 Major Indoor Soccer League All-Star Game MVP: 1989
Landon Donovan MVP Award: 1997, 2003
MLS Golden Boot: 1997, 2003
National Soccer Hall of Fame: Class of 2010
Indoor Soccer Hall of Fame: Class of 2013

References

External links

 Preki profile at United States National Soccer Players
 MISL stats
 

1963 births
Living people
American people of Serbian descent
Footballers from Belgrade
Yugoslav emigrants to the United States
Yugoslav footballers
Serbian footballers
American soccer players
Association football midfielders
Red Star Belgrade footballers
Tacoma Stars players
St. Louis Storm players
Everton F.C. players
San Jose Grizzlies players
Portsmouth F.C. players
Sporting Kansas City players
Miami Fusion players
Yugoslav First League players
Major Indoor Soccer League (1978–1992) players
Premier League players
Continental Indoor Soccer League players
English Football League players
Major League Soccer players
Major League Soccer All-Stars
United States men's international soccer players
1998 CONCACAF Gold Cup players
1998 FIFA World Cup players
National Soccer Hall of Fame members
Yugoslav expatriate footballers
Serbian expatriate footballers
American expatriate soccer players
Yugoslav expatriate sportspeople in Sweden
Serbian expatriate sportspeople in Sweden
Serbian expatriate sportspeople in England
American expatriate sportspeople in Sweden
American expatriate sportspeople in England
Expatriate footballers in Sweden
Expatriate footballers in England
Serbian football managers
American soccer coaches
Chivas USA non-playing staff
Chivas USA coaches
Toronto FC coaches
Sacramento Republic FC coaches
Saint Louis FC coaches
Seattle Sounders FC non-playing staff
Major League Soccer coaches
USL Championship coaches
Serbian expatriate football managers
American expatriate soccer coaches
American expatriate sportspeople in Canada
Expatriate soccer managers in Canada